The Pacific Securities Co., Ltd. is a Chinese investment bank and brokerage firm. The company is listed on the Shanghai Stock Exchange.

As on 28 November 2016, The Pacific Securities is a constituent of CSI 300 Index (and mid-cap sub-index CSI 200 Index) and SSE 180 Index.

The company controls a SPAC listed on NASDAQ. The company also owns 39% stake in Lao-China Securities, a company based in Vientiane, capital and largest city of Laos.

History
The Pacific Securities was founded in 2004 and received the clients of bankrupted Yunnan Securities. In April 2007 it was converted to company limited by shares, with a nominal value of  each.

It was reported that Xiao Jianhua was behind the operation on listing the company to Shanghai Stock Exchange in 2007. Irregularity was founded after, by-then vice-governor of China Development Bank, Wang Yi was arrested. Wang was the vice-chairman of China Securities Regulatory Commission (CSRC) until 1999.

In December 2007, the largest shareholder of the Pacific Securities was the consortium of Beijing Ximeng Real Estate (13.34%), Beijing Huaxin Liuhe Investment (13.20%), China Foreign Economy and Trade Trust (FOTIC, 10.00%), UOB Mainland Investment (6.67%), Yunnan State-Owned Assets Management (3.33%) and CMST Development (3.33%). The Pacific Securities also exchanged its shares with the shares of Unida (former code ), a company delisted in 2007. Other major shareholders were Puhua Investment (10.00%), Taishan Xiangsheng (10.00%), "China Energy Development Electricity (Group)" (6.67%) and "Heilongjiang Century Huarong Investment Management" (5.77%) Those shareholders owned 82.31% shares, with 36 months restriction to sell.

5 out of 6 companies renewed the shareholders' agreement in March 2010 (FOTIC withdrew), as well as "Yunnan State-Owned Assets Management" transferred part of its stake to another Yunnan Government-owned company: Yunnan Industrial Investment Group. The consortium owned 39.88% shares of the company as the largest shareholder, as well as the chairman of the Pacific Securities, Zheng Yanan, was also the chairman of UOB Mainland Investment. However, the consortium sold most of their shares since 2011 (decreased to 32.68% in December 2011, 25.38% in December 2012)

The shareholders' agreement was expired again in March 2013, which only Huaxin Liuhe increased its shares (from 10.83% to 10.89%), as well as Yunnan Industrial Investment Group retained its 3.19% shares; Beijing Ximeng Real Estate, UOB Mainland Investment and CMST Development sold their 7.62%, 2.31% and 1.42% shares to 3.79%, 0.31% and unknown level respectively. It was reported that Pacific Securities was ranked the least among the listed "securities firms" of China, in term of revenue of the first half of 2013.

In 2012 the Pacific Securities founded a joint venture in Laos.

Each old share also received 0.5 new share in December that year (by converting the share premium into share capital), making the share capital had increase from 1,653,644,684 to 3,530,467,026.

Shareholders
As at 31 December 2015, the only shareholder with more than 5% shares was Beijing Huaxin Liuhe Investment for 12.75% (450,248,500). Despite 225 million of them were restricted to sell (until 21 April 2019), more than half of its shares (251,020,000) were pledged, to China Fortune International Trust (160 million restricted shares) since December 2015, to China Merchants Securities (51.98 million free-floating shares) since March–April 2015, as well as pledged to other companies. The shares pledged to China Merchants Securities, all of them were also pledged to the same investment bank from March 2014 to February 2015 (108 million shares free-floating shares); the shares pledged to China Fortune International Trust, were also pledged to New China Fushi from April 2014 to November–December 2015 (225 million restricted shares).

The second largest shareholder, which owned 4.25% shares (150 million), is a private company based in Dalian. The company bought 100 million number of shares from non-public offering for  each (before 0.5 additional new shares to each 1 old share). However, the company also pledged 140 million shares as at 31 December 2015.

Financial data

Note, share capital and number of shares had changed in 2007, 2012 and 2014

Footnotes

References

External links
 

Companies based in Kunming
Companies listed on the Shanghai Stock Exchange
Investment banks in China
Financial services companies of China
Former government-owned companies of China
Civilian-run enterprises of China